Lists of schools in Tokyo include:

By district
 List of schools in Adachi, Tokyo
 List of municipal schools in Shinjuku (only has schools operated by the Shinjuku City (Ward) Board of Education)

By level
 List of elementary schools in Tokyo
 List of junior high schools in Tokyo
 List of high schools in Tokyo
 A list of prefectural high schools is in: Tokyo Metropolitan Board of Education
 
Note that multi-level schools are on at least two of these lists.

By type
 List of special education schools in Tokyo